Edmonton-Castle Downs is a provincial electoral district in Alberta, Canada. The district is one of 87 mandated to return a single member to the Legislative Assembly of Alberta using the first past the post method of voting.

The district was created in 1997 boundary redistribution when Edmonton-Roper merged with the north half of Edmonton-Mayfield. The riding has swung between Liberal and Progressive Conservative control since it was created, before returning an NDP MLA in 2015. The 2004 election was very controversial, with near even support for both the Liberal and Progressive Conservative candidates. The outcome was decided in the third recount, which resulted in Thomas Lukaszuk winning the riding by 3 votes.

Neighborhoods in this riding include: Baturyn, Caernarvon, Carlisle, Beaumaris, Lorelei, Dunluce, Klarvatten, Rapperswill, Chambery & Elsinore.

The riding was last contested in the 2019 election, during which the NDP incumbent, Nicole Goehring, defeated Ed Ammar of the United Conservative Party by 2,017 votes.

History
The electoral district was created in the 1996 boundary redistribution from parts of Edmonton-Mayfield and Edmonton-Roper. The 2010 boundary redistribution saw some big changes to the riding with all land west of 127 street ceded to Edmonton-Calder and the eastern boundary that existed at 97 Street between the Edmonton city limits and 167 Avenue moved east to 82 Street in land that was part of Edmonton-Decore.

Boundary history

Electoral history

The electoral district was created in the 1997 boundary redistribution. The first election held in 1997 saw Liberal candidate Pamela Paul-Zobaric elected. She won a very closely contested race, defeating Progressive Conservative candidate Ihor Broda and two other candidates by just over 100 votes. She left the Liberal caucus over rights issues for women on November 15, 1999 to sit as an Independent. She did not run again in the 2001 election.

The second representative of the district was Progressive Conservative Thomas Lukaszuk. He won a three-way race in the 2001 general election with just over half the popular vote to pick up the seat for his party. He ran for a second term in 2004. Lukaszuk appeared defeated on election night by a few votes over Liberal candidate Chris Kibermanis. A recount by Elections Alberta confirmed Kibbermanis as the winner and declared him as the elected member. Lukaszuk and his campaign team took the recount process to the courts, and won the election in the judicial recount.

Lukaszuk and Kibermanis both stood for election in 2008. Lukaszuk won with over half the popular vote, while Kibbermanis dropped to 36% of the total. Lukaszuk was re-elected in 2012; while his strict vote count only increased by around 700, his majority increased from 2,069 in 2008 to 4,697 in 2012.

In the 2015 Alberta General Election NDP MLA Nicole Goehring was elected with 64.5% of the vote, with Lukaszuk dropping to second with 23% of the popular vote.

Legislature results

1997 general election

2001 general election

2004 general election and judicial recount
The 2004 election saw a field of five candidates. Incumbent Thomas Lukaszuk was running for his second term in office after winning a close race in 2001. Chris Kibermannis was chosen as the Liberal candidate. He was a former draft pick for the Winnipeg Jets and a welder by trade. The NDP chose Peter Cross, who is a small business owner working as a graphics artist and long time Edmonton resident.

Rounding out the field of candidates, the Alberta Alliance running their first campaign acclaimed candidate Colin Presizniuk and Social Credit run candidate Ross Korpi. Presizniuk is a high-profile Edmonton area accountant and consultant who runs Presizniuk and Associates.

The 2004 election proved to very contentious. On election night returns for the district had Liberal candidate Chris Kibermanis winning an incredibly tight race by three votes over Progressive Conservative incumbent Thomas Lukaszuk. The race split the riding's 79 precincts with Kibermanis winning 43 to Lukaszuk's 36. The poll by poll numbers show the race was evenly divided across the board as no candidate was particularly strong in a geographic area. The other three candidates were only a marginal factor with the race polarizing between the Progressive Conservatives and the Liberals. NDP candidate Peter Cross made a respectable but distant third place showing. He gained votes for his party winning a slightly higher plurality, but decreasing in percentage of popular vote over the 2001 results.

At the bottom of the field, the Alberta Alliance candidate Colin Presizniuk took about 5% of the popular vote. His results were consistent with the party's showing in other Edmonton districts. The Social Credit party running their first candidate in the riding since 1997, saw a significant decrease in support as Ross Korpi barely registered with voters.

The razor thin election night margin separating the two candidates kept the results in doubt. The automatic recount process completed a few days later by returning officer Elizabeth Burk,
narrowed the margin even further as Lukaszuk would gain two votes. In addition to the results, voter turnout in the riding dropped to a record low almost reaching 42%. The turn out was significantly down falling five points from the 2001 election, and almost nine percentage points from the election in 1997.

After the Official results were announced by Elections Alberta, the legislative standings on the Alberta Legislature website had been updated to reflect Kibermanis winning as a member-elect. The Progressive Conservatives immediately challenged the results in the Court of Queen's Bench. The first judge at the Court of Queen's Bench upheld the returning officers verdict of a three-vote margin. A second count was done and the results were verified the same as the first. The Progressive Conservatives appealed the results to the Court of Appeal of Alberta.

The Alberta Court of Appeals disputed a number of previously rejected ballots increasing the margin of Thomas Lukaszuk from 5,016 votes to 5,022 votes. The court also added some votes for Presizniuk and took some away for Cross, Korpi and Kibermanis did not see any change in their totals. As a result of the judicial ruling, the previous judicial counts and the Elections Alberta official count were over turned. Kibermanis did not have the resources to appeal the third judicial decision and conceded defeat. Thomas Lukaszuk was declared re-elected and returned to office. After the results were made official, the Liberals announced that Kibermanis would be the candidate for the next general election and would continue campaigning in the riding until the next writ period.

As a direct result of this election, both the campaigns for Thomas Lukaszuk and Chris Kibermanis filed an application to the Court of Appeal to reimburse the legal costs of contesting the results. No provisions existed under the Election Act and the appeals were denied. In October 2005 the Standing Legislative Offices Committee reviewed the matter and changes were recommended to allow candidates to be reimbursed for their legal costs.

2008 general election

2012 general election

2015 general election

2019 general election

Senate nominee results

2004 Senate nominee election district results

Voters had the option of selecting 4 Candidates on the Ballot

2012 Senate nominee election district results

Student Vote results

2004 election

On November 19, 2004 a Student Vote was conducted at participating Alberta schools to parallel the 2004 Alberta general election results. The vote was designed to educate students and simulate the electoral process for persons who have not yet reached the legal majority. The vote was conducted in 80 of the 83 provincial electoral districts with students voting for actual election candidates. Schools with a large student body that reside in another electoral district had the option to vote for candidates outside of the electoral district then where they were physically located.

2012 election

References

External links
Website of the Legislative Assembly of Alberta
2005 Judicial Recount

Alberta provincial electoral districts
Politics of Edmonton